Ibrahima Guèye (born 7 September 1941) is a Senegalese athlete. He competed in the men's discus throw at the 1976 Summer Olympics.

References

1941 births
Living people
Athletes (track and field) at the 1976 Summer Olympics
Senegalese male discus throwers
Olympic athletes of Senegal
Place of birth missing (living people)